Baron Arthur Haulot (15 November 1913 – 24 May 2005) was a Belgian journalist, humanist and poet who served, during World War II as an active member of the Belgian resistance. As president of the Jeunes Socialistes (young socialists), he was made prisoner and taken to the Dachau concentration camp.

After his liberation from the camp, he spoke about the atrocities of the Nazi regime and its efforts to impose a regime that precludes free speech and many forms of freedom and liberties, this leading to extermination of any opponents to the regime, and many people considered as passively opposed to the Regime, like the Jews, the Romani and many others.

He died in Brussels as a result of a thrombosis.

References

External links 
 https://web.archive.org/web/20120717052242/http://www.arthurhaulot.be/
Groupe Mémoire - Groep Herinnering

1913 births
2005 deaths
Belgian poets in French
20th-century Belgian journalists
Male journalists
Walloon people
Belgian resistance members
Dachau concentration camp survivors
Deaths from thrombosis
Writers from Liège
20th-century Belgian poets
Belgian male poets
20th-century Belgian male writers